A Sunday in Kigali (original French title: Un dimanche à Kigali) is a 2006 Canadian feature film set during the Rwandan genocide. It is directed by Robert Favreau based on the novel A Sunday at the pool in Kigali by Gil Courtemanche.

Plot
Bernard Valcourt, a documentary filmmaker, and journalist, sets off to Kigali to film a documentary about AIDS. He gets caught up in the turmoil of horrific events involving Hutus and Tutsis that tragically leads to genocide. During his stay at the Hôtel des Mille Collines, Valcourt falls in love with a beautiful, shy waitress named Gentille. Gentille serves drinks to the diplomats, officials, and Rwandan bourgeoisie who surround the hotel swimming pool every Sunday. While Valcourt's longing for Gentille increases, the country moves toward civil war, and the brutal violence of the Rwandan genocide separates them.  A few months go by and Bernard returns to Rwanda, frantically seeking Gentille in the midst of the chaos. Most of the narrative unfolds in retrospect.

Release
A Sunday in Kigali grossed $1.1 million Canadian in Quebec in the fall of 2006, and is set for September 23 release in English-speaking Canada. Video and cable are the best options in other territories.

Cast
Luc Picard as Bernard Valcourt
Fatou N'Diaye as Gentille
Vincent Bilodeau as Father Cardinal 
Céline Bonnier as Élise
Geneviève Brouillette as Consule 
Alice Isimbi
Fayolle Jean as Victor
Maka Kotto as Manu
Louise Laparé as Manu's Wife
Alexis Martin as Lamarre 
Luck Mervil as Raphaël 
Mireille Metellus as Agathe
Luc Proulx as Father Louis 
Guy Thauvette as Lt. Roméo Dallaire
Erwin Weche as D.J. Rock
Léonce Ngabo as Maurice
Jean-Chris Banange as Odeste
Natacha Muziramakenga as Emerita 
Eric Kabanda as Cyprien 
Amélie Chérubin Soulières as Mathilde
Jean de la Paix Hategekimana as Cyprien's cousin 
Valentin Utaruhijimana as Célestin
Johanna Ingabiré as Désirée 
Aline Muhora as Georgina
Jean Mutsari as Jean Damascène
Diane Nyiraparasi as Berthe

Reception

Box office
Eight weeks into its release, Robert Favreau's Rwandan genocide drama is the first Quebecois film of 2006 to pass the CAN $1m benchmark at the local box office.

Critical response
On Rotten Tomatoes, the film has an approval rate of 88% based on 59 reviews.

The sites' critical consensus reads, "A strident, well-meaning film that makes the mistake of doing all our thinking and feeling for us." Geoff Pevere give the film a 2 out of 4 rating, stating "here's something about the idea of weeping over a single love affair ... while hundreds of thousands are being slaughtered that verges on its own form of myopic irresponsibility." Writer for Variety Robert Koehler also gave it 2 out of 4 stars and said: "Pic is truly undone by a bizarre structure that constantly cuts between the timeframe before the 100-day massacre and the aftermath."

Accolades
Since its release, the film has been nominated for 42 festivals and awards.

Won
 2006 Marrakech International Film Festival – Best Actress (Fatou N'Diaye)
 2007 Genie Awards – Best Screenplay, Adapted (Robert Favreau, Gil Courtemanche)
 2007 Jutra Awards 2007 – Best Sound (Claude La Haye, Hans Peter Strobl & Marie-Claude Gagné)

Nominated
 2006 Marrakech International Film Festival - Golden Star (Robert Favreau)
 2007 Genie Awards – Best Motion Picture (Lyse Lafontaine & Michael Mosca)
 2007 Genie Awards – Best Achievement in Costume Design (Michèle Hamel)
 2007 Genie Awards – Best Achievement in Direction (Robert Favreau)
 2007 Genie Awards – Best Performance by an Actor in a Leading Role (Luc Picard)
 2007 Genie Awards – Best Performance by an Actress in a Leading Role (Fatou N'Diaye)
 2007 Genie Awards – Best Achievement in Overall Sound (Hans Peter Strobl, Jo Caron, Claude La Haye, Benoit Leduc, Bernard Gariépy Strobl)
 2007 Genie Awards – Best Achievement in Sound Editing (Marie-Claude Gagné, Guy Francoeur, Claire Pochon, Jean-Philippe Savard)
 2007 Jutra Awards 2007 – Best Film (Lyse Lafontaine & Michael Mosca)

More Festivals and Awards

Toronto International Film Festival (Canada): September 2006
Atlantic Film Festival (Canada): September 2006
Cinéfest Sudbury International Film Festival (Canada): September 2006
Vancouver International Film Festival (Canada): October 2006
Busan International Film Festival (South Korea): October 2006
Franzoesiche Filmtage, Tuebingen (Germany): November 2006
Festival des Films Francophone du Manitoba – Cinémental (Canada): November 2006
Festival International du Film Francophone de Tuebingen-Stuttgart (Germany): November 2006
Windsor International Film Festival (Canada): November 2006
Cape Town World Cinema Festival (South Africa): November 2006
Johannesburg Film Festival South Africa (South Africa): November 2006
Semaine du Cinéma Canadien (Senegal): November 2006
Festival du Québec à Paris (France): November 2006
Pan African Film Festival (USA): February 2007
Brazzaville Film Festival (Congo): 2007
Fédération des Francophones du Saskatoon (Canada): February 2007
Kalamazoo Francophone Film Festival (USA): March 2007
Maputo Film Festival (Mozambique): September 2007
Lusaka Film Festival (Zambia): November 2007
Alger Film Festival (Algeria): December 2007
Seattle Film Festival (USA): June/July 2007
Stony Brook Film Festival (USA): July 2007
Festival El Cine in Lima (Peru): August 2007
Les 25e Rendez-vous du Cinéma Québécois (Canada): February 2007
Bermuda International Film Festival (Bermuda): March 2007 – The 10th edition of the Bermuda International Film Festival came to a close when the French Canadian film "A Sunday in Kigali" won the Bacardi Limited Audience Choice Award.
Tiburon International Film Festival (USA): March 2007
Semaine de la Francophonie 2007, Boston Mars 2007 / Athènes Mars 2007 / New York Avril 2007
Phoenix Film Festival (USA): April 2007 – Peoples Choice & Best Feature Film
Kinshasa Film Festival (Congo): June 2007
FÉMI Festival International du Cinéma de la Guadeloupe (Guadeloupe): January 2007

References

External links

2006 films
Films directed by Robert Favreau
Canadian drama films
Films based on Canadian novels
Rwandan genocide films
2006 drama films
French-language Canadian films
2000s Canadian films